Chrysotus neopicticornis is a species of long-legged fly in the family Dolichopodidae.

References

Diaphorinae
Articles created by Qbugbot
Insects described in 1967
Diptera of North America
Taxa named by Harold E. Robinson